Pingle may refer to:


People
 Charles Pingle (1880–1928), politician from Alberta, Canada
 Moropant Trimbak Pingle (died 1683), the first Peshwā in the court of Shivāji
 Vishnu Ganesh Pingle (1888–1915), Indian revolutionary and member of the Ghadar Party
 Bahiroji Pingale, a Peshwa of the Maratha Empire
 Nikhil Pingle, an Indian figure skater

Places in China
 Pingle County (平乐县), of Guilin, Guangxi

Towns (平乐镇)
 Pingle, Henan, a town in Mengjin County, Henan
 Pingle, Luchuan County, a town in Guangxi

 Pingle, Pingle County, a town in Guangxi
 Pingle, Qionglai, Sichuan
 Pingle, Yanling, Hunan

Others
 Banksia squarrosa, an Australian plant commonly known as Pingle
 The Pingle Academy, a state comprehensive school in South Derbyshire, England
 Pingle Cutting, a nature reserve north of Warboys in Cambridgeshire, England